Scifentology II is American hip hop artist Yak Ballz’s second full-length album.  It features production from Aesop Rock, Mondee, the late Camu Tao, Chapter 7, Adept and Chris Maestro. Guest features include Cage, Tame One, Peter Toh, Thomas Phenomas and Slow Suicide Stimulus.  Full color art work by graffiti graphic artist Ewok One 5MH.

Track listing

Notes and references

2008 albums
Yak Ballz albums
Albums produced by Aesop Rock